Jackson Township is the name of 6 townships in the U.S. state of Missouri:

 Jasper Township, Camden County, Missouri
 Jasper Township, Dallas County, Missouri
 Jasper Township, Jasper County, Missouri
 Jasper Township, Ozark County, Missouri
 Jasper Township, Ralls County, Missouri
 Jasper Township, Taney County, Missouri

See also 
 Jasper Township (disambiguation)

Missouri township disambiguation pages